Wulverhorst is a former municipality in the Dutch province of Utrecht. It was located south of Woerden. Wulverhorst was a separate municipality between 1818 and 1857, when it was merged with Linschoten. The area is now a part of Montfoort as well as Woerden.

On the grounds there has existed a castle from the 13th century which felt into ruins and was finally demolished in 1837.

References

Former municipalities of Utrecht (province)
Montfoort